Käru may refer to several places in Estonia:

Käru Parish, municipality in Rapla County
Käru, small borough in Käru Parish, Rapla County
Käru, Lääne-Viru County, village in Väike-Maarja Parish, Lääne-Viru County
Käru, Pärnu County, village in Varbla Parish, Pärnu County

See also
Karu (disambiguation)